Fernando Arbello (May 30, 1906 in Ponce, Puerto Rico – July 26, 1970) was a Puerto Rican jazz trombonist and composer who spent most of his career in America.

Biography

Fernando Arbello (also spelled Arbelo) was born May 30, 1906 in Ponce, Puerto Rico to Eladio Arbelo and Raimunda Cruz. He was the second oldest born of seven children. Arbello first started on trombone at the age of 12. He later attended the Puerto Rico Conservatory of Music in Ponce to further his musical training where he not only learned to play, but composed music as well. He played locally in high-school bands and symphony orchestras, then moved to New York City in the middle of the 1920s. There he played with Earle Howard, Wilbur De Paris, June Clark, and  Bingie Madison before the close of the decade. Early in the 1930s he played intermittently with Claude Hopkins for several years, then worked with Chick Webb, Fletcher Henderson, Lucky Millinder, Billy Hicks, and Fats Waller, before returning to play under Hopkins again near the end of the 1930s.

In 1940, Arbello worked for a few months with Zutty Singleton, then led his own, unsuccessful, band briefly in 1940-41. Later in 1941 he played again in Henderson's ensemble, then with Marty Marsala (1941) and Jimmie Lunceford (1942–46). He led his own band again late in the 1940s, maintaining it for several years, though he never recorded with this outfit. In 1953 he played with Rex Stewart and played in a reunion band with Henderson once more; in 1960 he was a sideman for Machito.

Fernando Arbello continued to enjoy playing and composing music while residing in the Bronx with his family. He returned to Puerto Rico later in life, but regularly visited New York. In 1970, while on vacation visiting family in the Bronx, he fell ill and was rushed to the hospital where he subsequently died of a heart attack. Arbello is buried in Ferncliff Cemetery located at 280 Secor Rd. Hartsdale, NY.  He was survived by his wife, Isabel Vasquez Torres Arbelo, six children (Ferdinand, Isabel, Evelyn, Hector, Albert and Carmen) and grandchildren leaving behind a legacy of great music to be echoed throughout time. <Albert Arbelo Sr. [son]>

References
Eugene Chadbourne, [ Fernando Arbello] at Allmusic

1906 births
1970 deaths
Puerto Rican jazz musicians
American jazz trombonists
Male trombonists
20th-century trombonists
20th-century American male musicians
American male jazz musicians